Parmouti 1 - Coptic Calendar - Parmouti 3

The second day of the Coptic month of Parmouti, the eighth month of the Coptic year. In common years, this day corresponds to March 28, of the Julian Calendar, and April 10, of the Gregorian Calendar. This day falls in the Coptic Season of Shemu, the season of the Harvest.

Commemorations

Martyrs 

 The martyrdom of Saint Christopher

Saints 

 The departure of Pope John IX, the 81st Patriarch of the See of Saint Mark

References 

Days of the Coptic calendar